Whaletone is a British company headed by Polish designer Robert Majkut that produces a series of digital grand pianos noted for their advanced aesthetic and technical design.

References

External links
 Official site

Piano manufacturing companies of the United Kingdom
British brands